The Institute of Statistics and Economic Studies - New Caledonia (ISEE-NC) is a public institution in New Caledonia that collects, produces and analyzes statistical information.

References

External links 
 

National statistical services
Government of New Caledonia
1985 establishments in New Caledonia
Organizations established in 1985